Take Off with Bradley & Holly is a British television game show presented by Bradley Walsh and Holly Willoughby, and produced by Hungry Bear Media for the BBC. On the show, members of the public compete to win seats on a plane to a dream holiday destination.

The show was originally a one-off Christmas special that broadcast on 24 December 2019 on BBC One. In February 2020, the BBC announced that they had ordered a four episode series, which would begin airing on 24 July 2021 on BBC One.

The series was filmed before the COVID-19 pandemic and the related travel restrictions caused by the pandemic.

References

External links
 
 
 

2019 British television series debuts
2021 British television series endings
2010s British game shows
2020s British game shows
BBC high definition shows
BBC television game shows
English-language television shows
Television series by Hungry Bear Media
Television shows shot at BBC Elstree Centre